The Pittsburgh Open is a defunct WTA Tour affiliated women's tennis tournament played from 1979 to 1984. It was held in Pittsburgh, Pennsylvania in the United States and played on indoor carpet courts.

Results

Singles

Doubles

References
 WTA Results Archive

 
Carpet court tennis tournaments
Indoor tennis tournaments
Recurring sporting events established in 1979
Defunct tennis tournaments in the United States
1979 establishments in Pennsylvania
1984 disestablishments in Pennsylvania
Recurring sporting events disestablished in 1984